The Baltimore International College (BIC), founded in 1972, was a private, non-profit college located in Baltimore, Maryland. It offered specialized degree programs in Culinary Arts and Hospitality Management. 
The college was taken over by Stratford University in January 2012.

History
BIC was accredited by the American Culinary Federation. It lost its accreditation from the Middle States Association of Colleges and Schools on August 31, 2011, due to unaddressed issues from its 2007 review. BIC was acquired by Stratford University in January 2012, and the former campuses are now Stratford campuses.

Campus & facilities
The college's main campus is located in downtown Baltimore near the Inner Harbor. The college owns two full-service hotels downtown Baltimore—the Mount Vernon Hotel and Hopkins Inn. Further, BIC owns and operates the Bay Atlantic Club, which offers delivery breakfast and lunch, dine-in lunch, and as banquet hall with reservations.  In addition, the college operates the Park Hotel on its 100-acre (400,000 m2) Virginia Park satellite campus in Virginia, County Cavan, Ireland.

Students
The college offers student housing in Dublin Hall, which is location in the Mount Vernon Hotel.  Slightly more than half (52 percent) of its 800 or so students are male.

References

External links
Baltimore International College website
MD Higher Education Commission Profile
Stratford University page on former  Baltimore International College

Downtown Baltimore
Universities and colleges in Baltimore
Cooking schools in the United States
Hospitality schools in the United States
Educational institutions established in 1972
1972 establishments in Maryland
Educational institutions disestablished in 2011
2011 disestablishments in Maryland
Defunct private universities and colleges in Maryland